Home is the twelfth studio album by American R&B recording artist Stephanie Mills. It was released June 26, 1989 on MCA Records and peaked at No. 5 on Billboard Top R&B Albums. The album features the R&B hit singles, the title track "Home" and "Something in the Way (You Make Me Feel)"; both were number one hits on Billboard Top R&B Songs chart.

Track listing

Notes
Track 12: "Something in the Way (You Make Me Feel)" (Remix) produced and arranged by Louil Silas Jr.

Personnel
Credits taken from album liner notes.
Executive producer – Cassandra Mills, Stephanie Mills 
Mastered by – Steve Hall
Backing vocals [all additional] – Stephanie Mills
Guitar – Randy Bowland (track 7), Kenny Hawkins, Paul Pesco (track 5), Ira Siegel (tracks 10 & 11)
Drums – Mike Caputy (track 5), John Robinson (track 4), Terry Silverlight (track 10), Buddy Williams (track 11)
Backing vocals – Audrey Wheeler, Genobia Jeter, Stephanie James (track 5), Angel Rogers, Marva King (track 6), Take 6 (track 3), Darryll Stokes, Dianne Garisto, Will Downing (track 10)
Mixed by – David Bianco, 
Horns – Daniel Higgins, Gary Grant, Jerry Hey (track 5)
Percussion – Steve Croom (track 10)
Piano – Robert Dampe (track 10)
Saxophone – Brandon Fields (track 5), Mark Rivera (track 10)
Electric piano [Rhodes], synth [bass, horns] – Curtis Dowd (track 3)
Keyboards – Donald Robinson (track 3), Bobby Jones (track 5), Eric Rehl (track 11) 
Bass [Spector] – Douglas Grisby (track 3), bass – Jerry Livingston (track 5), Nathan East (track 4), Wayne Brathwaite (track 10), Luico Hopper (track 11) 
Producers – Angela Winbush (tracks 1, 4 & 12), Nick Martinelli (track 3), Gene Griffin (tracks 2 & 9), LeMel Humes (track 5), Gerald Levert, Marc Gordon (track 7), Timmy Gatling (track 8), Sami McKinney, Kevin Phillips (track 6), Wayne Brathwaite (track 10), Barry J. Eastmond (track 11)
Producer [remix] – Louis Silas, Jr. (track 12)

Copyright (c) – MCA Records, Inc 
Phonographic Copyright (p) – MCA Records, Inc. 
Copyright (c) – MCA Records, Inc.Distributed, Manufactured By – MCA Records, Inc

Charts

Weekly charts

Year-end charts

Singles

References

External links
 at AllMusic

1989 albums
Stephanie Mills albums
MCA Records albums